Wilson County is a county in the U.S. state of Tennessee. It is in Middle Tennessee. As of the 2020 census, the population was 147,737. Its county seat is Lebanon. The largest city is Mt. Juliet. Wilson County is part of the Nashville-Davidson–Murfreesboro–Franklin, TN Metropolitan Statistical Area.

History

Wilson County was created in 1799 from a portion of Sumner County, and named for Major David Wilson, a Revolutionary War veteran and statesman.  The county remained predominantly agrarian throughout the 19th century. The arrival of the railroad after the Civil War boosted the county's timber sector, and several large factories were constructed in the county during the early 20th century.

Wilson County was the site of an important saltpeter mine. Saltpeter, the main ingredient of gunpowder, was obtained by leaching the earth from Valley Cave. Valley Cave is near Statesville. The many saltpeter hoppers still inside the cave indicate that this was a large mining operation. These saltpeter vats may date from the War of 1812 mining era or the Civil War mining era, or perhaps both. Further research is needed to determine when this mine was active.

Geography
The Cumberland River flows along the county's northern border with Trousdale and Sumner counties. This section of the river is part of Old Hickory Lake. Several streams in the western part of the county are part of the Stones River basin.

Wilson County is home to a large concentration of cedar glades, a unique ecosystem where the soil is too rocky or shallow for trees to grow.  Many of these glades are found in Cedars of Lebanon State Park.

Adjacent counties

Trousdale County (north)
Smith County (northeast)
DeKalb County (east)
Cannon County (southeast)
Rutherford County (south)
Davidson County (west)
Sumner County (northwest)

State protected areas
Cedars of Lebanon State Forest
Cedars of Lebanon State Park
Couchville Cedar Glade State Natural Area (part)
Gattinger's Cedar Glade and Barrens State Natural Area (part)
John and Hester Land Cedar Glades State Natural Area
Old Hickory Wildlife Management Area (part)
Percy Priest Wildlife Management Area (part)
Vesta Cedar Glade State Natural Area
Vine Cedar Glade State Natural Area

Major highways

Demographics

2020 census

As of the 2020 United States census, there were 147,737 people, 51,618 households, and 40,874 families residing in the county.

2010 census
As of the census of 2010, there were 113,993 people, 42,563 households, and 32,177 families living in the county. The population density was 199.64 persons per square mile. The housing unit density was 74.54 units per square mile. The racial makeup of the county was 89.30% White, 6.40% African American, 1.12% Asian, 0.35% Native American, 0.04% Pacific Islander, and 1.46% from two or more races. Those of Hispanic or Latino origins constituted 3.24% of the population.

Of all of the households, 33.22% had children under the age of 18 living in them, 60.08% were married couples living together, 4.33% had a male householder with no wife present, 11.19% had a female householder with no husband present, and 24.40% were non-families. 19.86% of households were one person and 7.29% were one person aged 65 or older. The average household size was 2.65 and the average family size was 3.03.

The age distribution was 25.06% under the age of 18, 62.78% ages 18 to 64, and 12.17% age 65 and older. The median age was 39.3 years. 51.02% of the population were females and 48.98% were males.

The median household income was $60,678, and the median family income was $70,092. Males had a median income of $49,293 versus $36,419 for females. The per capita income for the county was $27,814. About 5.6% of families and 7.6% of the population were below the poverty line, including 9.1% of those under the age of 18 and 8.1% of those age 65 and older.

2000 census
At the 2000 census there were 88,809 people, 32,798 households, and 25,582 families living in the county. The population density was 156 people per square mile (60/km2).
There were 34,921 housing units at an average density of 61 per square mile (24/km2). The racial makeup of the county was 91.50% White, 6.26% Black or African American, 0.32% Native American, 0.48% Asian, 0.03% Pacific Islander, 0.48% from other races, and 0.92% from two or more races. 1.27% of the population were Hispanic or Latino of any race.

Of the 32,798 households 37.20% had children under the age of 18 living with them, 64.20% were married couples living together, 10.10% had a female householder with no husband present, and 22.00% were non-families. 18.10% of households were one person and 6.10% were one person aged 65 or older. The average household size was 2.67 and the average family size was 3.03.

The age distribution was 26.20% under the age of 18, 7.70% from 18 to 24, 31.70% from 25 to 44, 24.70% from 45 to 64, and 9.70% 65 or older. The median age was 36 years. For every 100 females, there were 97.40 males. For every 100 females age 18 and over, there were 94.80 males.

The median household income was $50,140 and the median family income  was $56,650. Males had a median income of $39,848 versus $26,794 for females. The per capita income for the county was $22,739. About 4.60% of families and 6.70% of the population were below the poverty line, including 7.80% of those under age 18 and 11.50% of those age 65 or over.

Education
Wilson County Schools oversees 22 public schools, including 2 adult education centers and a technical education center.  The county has five high schools: Mount Juliet High School, Lebanon High School, Wilson Central High School, Green Hill High School, and Watertown High School.

Lebanon Special School District (LSSD) serves most of Lebanon and some unincorporated areas for K-8, though some parts of Lebanon are with Wilson County schools for all years K-12. Wilson County Schools operates the high schools that serve the LSSD territory.

Cumberland University is located in Lebanon.

Communities

Cities
 Mt. Juliet (largest city)
 Lebanon (county seat)

Town
 Watertown

Census-designated places
 Green Hill
 Rural Hill

Other unincorporated communities

 Belinda City
 Cainsville
 Cedar Grove
 Cherry Valley
 Commerce
 Doaks Crossroads
 Egan
 Gladeville
 Greenvale
 LaGuardo
 Leeville
 Liberty Hill
 Martha
 Norene
 Statesville
 Suggs Creek
 Tater Peeler
 Taylorsville
 Tuckers Crossroads
 Vine

Former community
 Big Spring

Education
It has two school districts, Lebanon Special School District and Wilson County School District. The latter has all high school zoning in the entire county, while the former has grades K-8 and special education services.

Notable people

 Jordan Anderson (1825–1907) – author of Letter from a Freedman to His Old Master (1865)
 Casey Atwood (b. 1980) – NASCAR driver
 Adrian Belew (b. 1949) – musical artist
 Charlie Daniels (1936-2020) – musical artist
 Dan Evins (1935–2012) – businessman and founder of the Cracker Barrel Old Country Store
 Bobby Hamilton (1957–2007) – NASCAR driver
 Erika Jo (b. 1986) – musical artist
 Chloe Kohanski – musical artist
 Dixon Lanier Merritt (1879–1972) – newspaper editor, historian, poet
 John J. Pettus (1813–1867) – 20th and 23rd Governor of Mississippi
 John S. Roane (1817–1867) – 4th Governor of Arkansas
 David P. Sartor (b. 1956) – classical composer
 Gretchen Wilson (b. 1973) – musical artist
 Ross Winn (1871–1912) – writer

Politics

In the 2004 U.S. presidential election, 65 percent of voters supported the reelection of President of the United States George W. Bush.
In the 2008 U.S. presidential election, 68 percent of voters favored Republican Senator John McCain. Since 2000 (as of 2020), Wilson County has shifted 31.4 points towards the Republican Party.

See also
 National Register of Historic Places listings in Wilson County, Tennessee

References

External links

 Official site
 Mt. Juliet Chamber of Commerce
 Lebanon-Wilson County Chamber of Commerce
 Wilson County Schools
 Wilson County Convention and Visitors Bureau
 Tennessee Central Economic Alliance for Wilson County
 Wilson County at TNGenWeb
 

 
Nashville metropolitan area
1799 establishments in Tennessee
Populated places established in 1799
Second Amendment sanctuaries in Tennessee
Middle Tennessee